Asteriacites is the name given to five-rayed trace fossils found in marine sedimentary rocks (Mángano et al., 1999; Wilson and Rigby, 2000). They record the burrows of ophiuroid and asteroid sea stars on the sea floor. Asteriacites are found in European and American rocks, from the Ordovician period onwards, and are especially numerous in the Triassic and Jurassic systems.

Dense assemblages of Asteriacites ('Asteriacites beds') are considered proxies for marine settings, low bioturbation intensity, shallow tiering, high sedimentation rate and/or event-bed deposition, significant levels of hydrodynamic energy, and low predation pressure.

Gallery

References

Prehistoric Asterozoa genera
Devonian echinoderms
Silurian echinoderms
Silurian animals of North America
Paleozoic echinoderms of North America
Devonian trace fossils
Trace fossils